Arge pagana is a sawfly in the family Argidae. It is known by the name "large rose sawfly" although the related species Arge ochropus is also known by this name.

Subspecies
 Arge pagana pagana (Panzer, 1798) 
 Arge pagana stephensii (Leach, 1817)  (British Isles)

Distribution
This species can be found in the Palearctic realm.

Description
Arge pagana can reach a length of about 1 cm. Wings and veins on the wings are black, often with blue metallic sheen. Pronotum and legs are also black. Its most conspicuous feature is a large rounded yellow abdomen. It has a black head and thorax and the legs are largely black. 
Larvae reach about 25 mm and are pale green with black dots and a yellow head.

Biology
The eggs are laid on roses. Larvae appear in early summer and reach full size by the end of July. The larvae are gregarious and live in colonies feeding on rose leaves (Rosa species, Rosa acicularis).

The pupal period is very short. Adults feed on nectar and pollen from Tanacetum vulgare and Heracleum sphondylium. During the warmer years there may be two or, rarely, three generations.

Gallery

References

External links
 A.Ramel LES TENTHREDES 
 la TENTHRÈDE du ROSIER (Arge pagana) 

Argidae
Hymenoptera of Europe
Insects described in 1798
Taxa named by Georg Wolfgang Franz Panzer